Semmelrogge is a German surname. Notable people with the surname include:

Martin Semmelrogge (born 1955), German actor, son of Willy
Willy Semmelrogge (1923–1984), German actor

German-language surnames